Akifumi (written: , , ,  or ) is a masculine Japanese given name. Notable people with the name include:

, Japanese voice actor
, Japanese actor
, Japanese BMX rider
, Japanese boxer
, Japanese anime and video game composer
, Japanese baseball player

Japanese masculine given names